MacPhie is a surname. Notable people with the surname include:

Brian MacPhie (born 1972), American tennis player
Fabio Ávila MacPhie (born 1987), Spanish orchestra director
Sergio Doménech MacPhie (born 1993), Romanian screenwriter
Pablo Martínez MacPhie (born 2001), Mexican CEO